Carotid plexus can refer to:
 Common carotid plexus
 Internal carotid plexus
 External carotid plexus